is a district located in Kagawa Prefecture, Japan. 

Due to the district government enforcement in 1899, the district was formed when the Naka and Tado Districts merged.

The district contains 3 towns:
Kotohira (琴平町),
Tadotsu (多度津町),
Mannō (まんのう町).

Timeline
March 16, 1899 - Naka and Tado Districts merged to form Nakatado District. (3 towns, 27 villages)
April 1, 1899 - The town of Marugame gained city status to become the city of Marugame. (2 towns, 27 villages)
November 3, 1901 - The villages of Zentsūji, Amino, and Yoshida merged to form the town of Zentsūji. (3 towns, 24 villages)
June 1, 1917 - The village of Rokugō merged into the city of Marugame. (3 towns, 23 villages)
May 10, 1942 - The village of Toyohara merged into the town of Tadotsu. (3 towns, 22 villages)
April 1, 1951 - The village of Minami merged into the city of Marugame. (3 towns, 21 villages)
April 1, 1953 - The village of Yoshima merged into the city of Sakaide. (3 towns, 20 villages)
March 31, 1954 (2 towns, 15 villages)
The village of Honjima merged into the city of Marugame.
The town of Zentsūji and the villages of Yoshiwara, Yogita, Tatsukawa, and Fudeoka merged to form the city of Zentsūji.
May 3, 1954 - The villages of Shika and Shirakata merged into the town of Tadotsu. (2 towns, 13 villages)
October 17, 1954 - The village of Gunge merged into the city of Marugame. (2 towns, 12 villages)
April 1, 1955 (3 towns, 7 villages)
The villages of Sogō and Shichika merged to form the village of Chūnan.
The town of Kotohira and Enai merged to form the town of Kotohira.
The villages of Yoshino, Kanno, and Shijō merged to form the town of Mannō.
July 1, 1955 - The village of Takashino merged into the town of Mannō. (3 towns, 6 villages)
1956年3月31日 - Parts of the town of Mannō merged into the town of Kotohira.
September 30, 1956 (3 towns, 4 villages)
The town of Mannō absorbed the village of Nagasumi, Ayauta District.
The villages of Sanagishima and Takamishima merged into the town of Tadotsu.
October 10, 1957 - Parts of the town of Mannō merged into the town of Kotohira.
November 1, 1957 - The village of Kotonami, Ayauta District moved to Nakatado District. (3 towns, 5 villages)
March 31, 1958 - The village of Zōgō split and merged into the town of Kotohira and the city of Zentsūji. (3 towns, 4 villages)
May 1, 1958 - The villages of Tarumi and Hiroshima merged into the city of Marugame. (3 towns, 2 villages)
April 1, 1962 - The village of Kotonami gained town status to become the town of Kotonami. (4 towns, 1 village)
January 1, 1970 - The village of Chūnan gained town status to become the town of Chūnan. (5 towns)
March 20, 2006 - The towns of Mannō (満濃町) absorbed the towns of Chūnan and Kotonami to form the new town of Mannō (まんのう町). (3 towns)

References

Nakatado District